Agrocybe sororia is a species of Basidiomycota mushroom in the genus Agrocybe. The cap is convex to plane, tawny fading to pale yellow-buff; the pileus sometimes is cracked, or wrinkled. The gills have an adnate attachment to the stipe. The spore print is cinnamon-brown. The stem is cylindrical, equal, concolor with the cap and lacks a ring; usually with white cords in the stem base. It is found in wood mulch. Odour and taste mealy (not bitter). This mushroom distributes in eastern North America.

Similar species
A. firma is similar but it has dark-brown pileus and lacks of mealy odour.
A. putaminum has mealy odour and a bitter taste. Also, has pileocystidia.

References

Strophariaceae